Yerilla Station is a pastoral lease that currently operates as a cattle station but has previously operated as a sheep station.

The homestead and four other houses provide a tennis court and swimming pool. The property is able to carry 10,000 sheep or 1,400 head of cattle and is watered by a quality underwater supply.

The abandoned town of Yerilla is situated within the station boundaries.
The company, Yerilla Station Limited, was registered in 1923 with capital of £20,000. The company was composed of Percy Robinson, Duncan Robinson, William Padbury and Charles Seabrook, and purchased the station from  Marsh in 1925. The new owners installed new fencing and swapped from raising cattle to raising sheep for the purpose of producing wool. 2,000 ewes were introduced to the property, which was thought to have a carrying capacity of about 10,000.

See also
List of ranches and stations

References

Pastoral leases in Western Australia
Stations (Australian agriculture)
Goldfields-Esperance